To Love (stylized as to LOVE) is Japanese R&B singer-lyricist Kana Nishino's second studio album. It was released on June 23, 2010, by SME Records. The album spawned four Oricon Top 10 singles, "Motto...", "Dear.../Maybe", "Best Friend" and "Aitakute Aitakute".

Background
"To Love" is Nishino's first album released after she solidified her popularity in the digital market. Despite Nishino's initial singles for her first album, Love One., not seeing much success, the songs promoted around the album's release ("Tōkutemo" feat. Wise, "Kimi ni Aitaku Naru Kara" and "Kimi no Koe o" feat. Verbal (M-Flo)) were gradual hits in the digital market. Since then, all of her singles have hit No. 1 on RIAJ's Digital Track Chart, which tracks full-length song downloads to cellphones. "Best Friend" stayed at No. 1 for three consecutive weeks, while "Aitakute Aitakute" and "Motto..." reached No. 1 for two.

Currently, "Aitakute Aitakute", "Best Friend," "Dear..." and "Motto..." are all certified for 750,000+ ringtone downloads and 500,000+ full-length cellphone downloads. "Maybe" has been downloaded on cellphones more than 100,000 times, along with a B-side to "Best Friend" "One Way Love" that is not present on the album.

Writing
Much like her first album, To Love is centred around a theme of love. As exactly one year had passed from her previous album, Nishino wanted to express the growth in her values and view on love. In an interview with Yahoo! Japan, Nishino stated that for the lyrics on the album she "makes an image from the music, then creates a short film made of images in her head, and from there creates the basis for the scenario for the lyrics.

Many of the songwriters from Nishino's first album worked with her again for To Love. Sizk, who worked on the prologue/epilogues from her first album worked on the second albums, while the singles were created with Giorgio Cancemi (who worked with Nishino on 2/3 of the later promotional tracks from Love One., "Tōkutemo" and "Kimi no Koe o"). One song was written by Australian songwriters Nervo ("Hey Boy"), much like the songs "Girlfriend" and Nishino's debut single "I"). Jeff Miyahara also returned to work with Nishino once again (after producing the single "Kimi ni Aitaku Naru Kara"), with "Summer Girl" feat. Minmi.

Chart ranking
The album debuted at No. 1 on Oricon's daily albums chart, selling 71,000 copies on its first day. It stayed at No. 1 for the first week, selling 290,000 copies. The album's first week sales are currently the highest for a solo artist in 2010. The album was certified triple platinum selling over 750,000 physical copies

Many album tracks were popular enough to chart digitally after the album's release. "Love & Smile", released a week before the album, was the most successful, peaking at No. 3. Others included "Summer Girl" feat. Minmi (No. 8), "Kono Mama de" (No. 14) and "You Are the One" (No. 64).

Track listing

Charts and certifications

Charts

Sales and certifications

Personnel

 Bachlogic - arrangement/music/production/programming (#9)
 Giorgio Cancemi - arrangement/music/production/recording (#2, #5, #8, #11-12), lyrics (#8, #12)
 DJ Mass (Vivid Neon*) - cuts/lyrics/music (#10), instruments (#4)
 Kotaro Egami (Supa Love) - arrangement/production (#7)
 Exxxit - music (#10)
 Grumpy (Digz, inc) - mixing (#6)
 Takuya Harada - vocal direction (#9, #13)
 Yuki Hasegawa - child chorus member (#6)
 Kenji "Jino" Hino - arrangement/music (#3)
 Hiro (Digz, inc) - vocal direction (#6)
 Satoshi Hosoi - mixing (#3-4, #9-10, #13)
 Marin Iitsuka - child chorus member (#6)
 Yuma Iitsuka - child chorus member (#6)
 Gonta Kawamoto - mixing (#7)
 Yuki Keity (Exxxit) - lyrics (#10)
 Kgro (Digz, inc) - recording (#6)
 Masa Kohama - arrangement/music (#3)
 Andreas Levander - music (#4)
 Mats Lie Skare - music (#13)
 Yasuo Matsumoto - mastering/mixing (#5)
 Minmi - lyrics/music/vocals (#3)
 Jeff Miyahara - arrangement/music (#3)
 Toshihiko Miyoshi - mastering (#2, #8, #11), mixing (#2, #8, #11-12)

 Miriam Nervo - music (#4)
 Olivia Nervo - music (#4)
 Kana Nishino - lyrics (all tracks), vocals (all tracks)
 Jonas Nordelius - music (#4)
 Mitsuki Ogasawara - child chorus member (#6)
 Kazuma Ogawa - child chorus member (#6)
 Shinquo Ogura - music (#11)
 Saeki Youthk - music (#7)
 Kazuhito Saito - mixing (#7), recording (#1, #4, #6, #9-10, #13-14)
 Hidekazu Sakai - mastering (all tracks)
 Winston Sela - music (#9)
 Daniel Sherman - music (#9)
 Sizk (Star Guitar) - arrangement/mixing/production (#1, #14)
 Rock Sakurai (Exxxit) - instruments (#4)
 So-Hey! (Nerdhead) - violin (#11-12)
 Himari Suzuki - child chorus member (#6)
 Toiza71 (Digz, inc) - arrangement/music (#6)
 ViVi - music (#1, #14)
 Vivid Neon* - arrangement/production (#4, #10)
 Yamachi - guitar (#2)
 Yuichi Yamada (Nerdhead) - keyboard (#2, #5, #8, #11-12)
 Takashi Yamaguchi - guitar (#4, #6)
 Zetton - arrangement/music/programming (#13)

References

2010 albums
Kana Nishino albums
SME Records albums